Chatham Municipal Airport  is a public airport located two miles (3 km) northwest of the central business district of Chatham, a town in Barnstable County, Massachusetts, United States. The airport is owned by the Town of Chatham. It has a full-service FBO (Cape Cod Flying Circus) and maintenance facility in their main building (Stick N Rudder Aero Maintenance). The flight school and sightseeing is operated by Cape Aerial Tours. Upstairs, there is also a restaurant and coffee company, Hangar B and B-Side, respectively, serving breakfast and lunch.

Facilities and Aircraft 

For 12-month period ending December 31, 2015 the airport averaged 55 aircraft operations per day: 57% local general aviation, 40% transient general aviation, 2% air taxi and <1% military. There are 37 aircraft based at this airport: 34 single engine, 2 multi-engine and 1 helicopter.

References

External links 

 CQX: Chatham Municipal Airport

Chatham, Massachusetts
Airports in Barnstable County, Massachusetts